Roger Federer (born 1981) is a Swiss former professional tennis player.

Federer may also refer to:
Federer (surname)
Federer family, a Swiss family
4726 Federer, a main-belt asteroid